Dere may refer to:
 Deira, kingdom in Northern England (559-664)
 Déré, village in Sami Department, Banwa Province, Burkina Faso
 Dere, Iraq, village in Amedi District, Dohuk province, Iraqi Kurdistan 
 Dere, Karaman, village in Karaman Province, Turkey
 Dere, Kozluk, village in Batman Province, Turkey
 Dere Street, Roman road from York into what is now Scotland
 Dere (beetle), genus of longhorn beetles in the family Cerambycidae

Name
 Ali Dere (born 1992), Turkish footballer
 Cansu Dere (born 1980), Turkish actress
 Laslo Đere (born 1995), Serbian tennis player